The UEFA European Under-18 Championship 1976 Final Tournament was held in Hungary. It also served as the European qualification for the 1977 FIFA World Youth Championship.

Qualification

|}

Teams
The following teams qualified for the tournament:

 
 
 
 
 
  (host)

Group stage

Group A

Group B

Group C

Group D

Semifinals

Third place match

Final

Qualification to World Youth Championship
The following teams qualified for the 1977 FIFA World Youth Championship: 
Semifinalists:
 
 
 
 
Qualification unclear:

External links
Results by RSSSF

UEFA European Under-19 Championship
1976
Under-18
Euro
UEFA European Under-18 Championship
UEFA European Under-18 Championship
International sports competitions in Budapest
1970s in Budapest
UEFA European Under-18 Championship